Zebina villenai is a species of minute sea snail, a marine gastropod mollusk or micromollusk in the family Zebinidae.

Description
The height of the shell attains 4.2 mm.

Distribution
This species occurs in the Atlantic Ocean off the Cape Verde Islands.

References

 Rolán E., 2005. Malacological Fauna From The Cape Verde Archipelago. Part 1, Polyplacophora and Gastropoda.

External links
  Rolán E. & Luque Á.A. 2000. The subfamily Rissoininae (Mollusca: Gastropoda: Rissoidae) in the Cape Verde Archipelago (West África). Iberus 18(1): 21-94

villenai
Gastropods described in 2000
Gastropods of Cape Verde